In theoretical physics, a non-abelian gauge transformation means a gauge transformation taking values in some group G, the elements of which do not obey the commutative law when they are multiplied.  By contrast, the original choice of gauge group in the physics of electromagnetism had been U(1), which is commutative.

For a non-abelian Lie group G, its elements do not commute, i.e. they in general do not satisfy 

. 

The quaternions marked the introduction of non-abelian structures in mathematics.

In particular, its generators ,
which form a basis for the vector space of infinitesimal transformations (the Lie algebra), have a commutation rule:

The structure constants  quantify the lack of commutativity, and do not vanish. We can deduce that the structure constants are antisymmetric in the first two indices and real. The normalization is usually chosen (using the Kronecker delta) as 

Within this orthonormal basis, the structure constants are then antisymmetric with respect to all three indices.

An element  of the group can be expressed near the identity element in the form 

,
 
where  are the parameters of the transformation.

Let  be a field that transforms covariantly in a given representation . 
This means that under a transformation we get

Since any representation of a compact group is equivalent to a unitary representation, we take 

 

to be a unitary matrix without loss of generality.
We assume that the Lagrangian  depends only on the field  and the derivative :

If the group element  is independent of the spacetime coordinates (global symmetry), the derivative of the transformed 
field is equivalent to the transformation of the field derivatives:

Thus the field  and its derivative transform in the same way. By the unitarity of the representation, 
transformation of the non-abelian group.

Any Lagrangian constructed out of such scalar products is globally invariant:

Gauge theories